Nathan Talbott (born 21 October 1984) is an English professional football midfielder who last played for Stafford Rangers.

Talbott was born in Wolverhampton and began his career with Wolverhampton Wanderers, turning professional in July 2003. He failed to break into the first team at Molineux and left to join Yeovil Town on a free transfer in March 2004. He made his league debut for Yeovil, on 17 April 2004 as an injury-time substitute for Kevin Gall in the 2–1 home win against Bury. However, this was to be his only first team appearance for the Glovers.

He joined Stafford Rangers in August 2004 and was voted runner-up for the February 2005 Nationwide North Player of the Month award.

External links

1984 births
Living people
Footballers from Wolverhampton
English footballers
Wolverhampton Wanderers F.C. players
Yeovil Town F.C. players
Stafford Rangers F.C. players
English Football League players
National League (English football) players
Association football midfielders